The Monastery of Xuvia, also known as San Martiño de Xuvia or San Martín de Xubia, is located in the Parish of the same name in the city of Narón (Galicia). The current building was built at the beginning of the 12th century, in Romanesque style.

The first document from the Diplomatic Collection of this Monastery, is dated 15 May in the year 977, and it describes a donation made by a Galician noblewoman called  Visclavara Vistrariz to the monastery. In this document it is said that this monastery was "ever known."

Monasteries in Galicia (Spain)
Bien de Interés Cultural landmarks in the Province of A Coruña